Steven Mark Yedlin,  (born September 29, 1975) is an American cinematographer who studied at the USC School of Cinematic Arts. He is best known for his collaboration with director Rian Johnson in his films. Yedlin is a member of the American Society of Cinematographers since 2015. Some of his best-known works include Brick, The Brothers Bloom, Looper, Star Wars: The Last Jedi, and Knives Out. Additional credits include the films San Andreas and Carrie.

Filmography

References

External links

1975 births
Living people
American cinematographers
Film people from Los Angeles
USC School of Cinematic Arts alumni